The Goose Hangs High is a 1925 American silent comedy film directed by James Cruze and written by Lewis Beach, Anthony Coldeway, and Walter Woods. There was a sound remake in 1932 called This Reckless Age.  The film stars Constance Bennett, Myrtle Stedman, George Irving, Esther Ralston, William R. Otis Jr., Edward Peil Jr., and Gertrude Claire. The film was released on March 30, 1925, by Paramount Pictures.

Plot
As described in a film magazine review, the Ingals prepare to give their home-coming children a big Christmas, despite the fact that they are almost penniless. They forget their parents, however, in the mad whirl of parties. Bernard Ingals tells his political boss what he thinks of him and resigns from his city job. Grandma tells the children the truth, and they pitch in and save the household and father gets a better job.

Cast

Dorothy The Goose Hangs High, Transcription-traduction du rapport d'évasion du Staff sergeant Robert G. Hauger (21 mai 1944) is the title of a booklet publicated by Le Huron immobile ed. (printed in France, 2018).

References

External links 
 
 Pressbook of advertising material for The Goose Hangs High at the Library of Congress

1925 films
1920s English-language films
Silent American comedy films
1926 comedy films
1926 films
Paramount Pictures films
Films directed by James Cruze
American black-and-white films
American silent feature films
1925 comedy films
1920s American films